Sharat Kovakab (Arabic: حبل كوكب) is a volcano in Syria.

References

Volcanoes of Syria
Volcanic fields
Holocene volcanoes